Tour-en-Bessin Airfield is a now-abandoned World War II military airfield near the commune of Tour-en-Bessin in  the Normandy region of northern France.

The United States Army Air Force established a temporary airfield on 12 July 1944, shortly after the Allied landings in France. It was constructed by the IX Engineering Command, 833rd and 846th Engineer Aviation Battalions.

History
Known as Advanced Landing Ground "A-13", the airfield consisted of a main 5000 foot long (1500 m) pierced steel planking (PSP) runway aligned 12/30 and a secondary 5000 foot PSP runway aligned 01/19. Tents were used for billeting and support facilities. An access road was built to the existing road infrastructure, as were a dump for supplies, ammunition, and gasoline drums, along with a potable water and electrical power for communications and station lighting.

The 373rd and 406th Fighter Groups flew P-47 Thunderbolts from Tour en Bessin. The fighters flew support missions during the Allied push into France, patrolling roads, strafing German military vehicles and bombing gun emplacements, anti-aircraft artillery, and concentrations of German troops in Normandy and Brittany. The B-26 Marauder 394th Bombardment Group also was assigned to the airfield.

After US forces moved east into central France with the advancing Allied armies, the airfield was used as a resupply and casualty evacuation airfield for several months, before being closed on 2 December 1944. The land returned to agricultural use.

Major units assigned
 373rd Fighter Group 19 July - 19 August 1944
 410th (R3), 411th (U9), 412th (V5) Fighter Squadrons (P-47)
 406th Fighter Group 30 July - 17 August 1944
 512th (L3), 513th (4P), 514th (O7) Fighter Squadrons (P-47)
 394th Bombardment Group 25 August - 18 September 1944
 584th (K5), 585th (4T), 586th (H9), 587th (SW) Bombardment Squadrons (B-26)

Current use
Today there is little or no physical evidence of the airfield's existence, although the south end of the 01/19 runway is visible by the curvature of some fields, and some slight ground disturbance in a field to the east probably is from the 12/30 runway.

A memorial to the men and units that were stationed at Tour-en-Bessin was placed on the D613 (former N13) between Vaucelles and Tour-en-Bessin.

References

External links

  Monument to Tour-en-Bessin Airfield
 A-13 Memorial

World War II airfields in France
Airfields of the United States Army Air Forces in France
Airports established in 1944